The 1875–76 Scottish Cup – officially the Scottish Football Association Challenge Cup – was the third season of Scotland's most prestigious football knockout competition. The number of entrants nearly doubled from the previous season with 49 teams included in the first round draw. The competition began on 2 October 1875 and concluded with the final replay on 18 March 1876. This was the first season that teams would only change ends at half time, the tradition of changing ends after a goal had been scored came to an end. The cup was won for the third time by Queen's Park who defeated fellow Glasgow club 3rd Lanark RV 2–0 in the replayed final.

Format

As with the previous competitions, the third edition of the Scottish Cup took on the format of a traditional knockout tournament. For the earlier rounds, the names of competing teams were placed into lots according to their districts and drawn into pairs. The home team for each tie was determined by the toss of a coin unless it was mutually agreed or only one of the two clubs drawn against one another had a private ground. In the event of a draw, the team who lost the toss would have the choice of ground for the replay. A similar procedure was used for subsequent rounds however, any club which had received a bye in the previous round would first be drawn against one of the winners of the previous round. The names of winning teams were placed into one lot for later rounds. The choice of venue for the final matches was reserved to the Scottish Football Association.

Calendar

Six teams qualified for the second round after drawing their first round replays

Teams
All 49 teams entered the competition in the first round.

First round
Edinburgh Thistle received a bye to the second round. Kilmarnock's 8–0 win over Ayr Eglinton set a new record for both the highest-scoring game and the biggest win in the competition.

Matches

Edinburgh district

Dunbartonshire district

Glasgow and suburbs

Renfrewshire district

Lanarkshire district

Ayrshire district

Replays

Edinburgh district

Dunbartonshire district

Glasgow and suburbs

Renfrewshire district

Lanarkshire district

Notes

Sources:

Second round

Matches

Lanarkshire district

Edinburgh district

Ayrshire district

Glasgow and suburbs

Dunbartonshire district

Renfrewshire district

Replays

Edinburgh district

Ayrshire district

Glasgow and suburbs

Notes

Sources:

Third round

Matches

Notes

Sources:

Quarter-finals
Dumbarton received a bye to the semi-finals.

Matches

Sources:

Semi-finals

Matches

Replay

Second replay

Sources:

Final

Replay

See also
1875–76 in Scottish football

References

1875-76
Cup
Scot